André Oumansky (born 15 August 1933) is a French actor. He appeared in more than eighty films since 1958.

Filmography

References

External links 
 

1933 births
Living people
French male film actors
French male television actors
French male stage actors
French male voice actors
French National Academy of Dramatic Arts alumni
Place of birth missing (living people)